Giovanni Francesco Biancolella (16 July 1604 – 5 February 1669) was a Roman Catholic prelate who served as Bishop of Nicotera (1667–1669).

Biography
Giovanni Francesco Biancolella was born in Aversa, Italy on 16 July 1604 and ordained a priest on 29 October 1628.
On 22 August 1667, he was appointed during the papacy of Pope Clement IX as Bishop of Nicotera.
He served as Bishop of Nicotera until his death on 5 February 1669.

References 

17th-century Italian Roman Catholic bishops
Bishops appointed by Pope Clement IX
1604 births
1669 deaths